Zayn or ZAYN may refer to:

People
 Zain (name), an Arabic name meaning "beauty" or "grace"
 Zayn Malik (born 1993), also known mononymously as Zayn or ZAYN, British recording artist and former member of One Direction

See also
 Zayn al-‘Ābidīn, son of Hussein and a great-grandson of Muhammad
 Zayn-e-Attar, also known as Ali ibn Husayn Ansari Shirazi and as Haji Zayn Attar, a 14th-century Persian physician
 Zayn Abu Zubaydah, a Saudi Arabian citizen held in U.S. custody in Guantanamo Bay
 Sami Zayn, the ring name of Canadian professional wrestler Rami Sebei
 Zayn ad-Din (disambiguation), an Arabic name meaning "grace of the faith"
 Zein (disambiguation)
 Zain (disambiguation)
Zane (disambiguation)
 Zayin, a Semitic letter